Bonnie Dobson (born November 13, 1940, Toronto, Ontario, Canada) is a Canadian folk music songwriter, singer, and guitarist, most known in the 1960s for composing the songs "I'm Your Woman" and "Morning Dew". The latter, augmented (with a controversial co-writing credit) by Tim Rose, became a melancholy folk rock standard, covered by Skating Polly, Fred Neil, Ralph McTell, Lulu, Nazareth, the Grateful Dead, the Jeff Beck Group, Robert Plant, the Pozo-Seco Singers, The 31st of February (including Gregg Allman, Duane Allman, and Butch Trucks of The Allman Brothers Band), Long John Baldry, DEVO and Einstürzende Neubauten, among many others.

Early life
Dobson was born in Toronto. Her father was a union organizer and opera lover. Her early music influences included Paul Robeson and The Weavers.

Career
Dobson became part of the active folk-revival scene in Toronto, performing in local coffee houses and at the Mariposa Folk Festival. She later moved to the United States where she performed in coffee houses across the country and recorded several albums, including 1962's Bonnie Dobson at Folk City, which contained her well-known song "Morning Dew".

Dobson has consistently questioned Tim Rose's right to a co-writing credit for "Morning Dew" (stating that Rose first heard it as sung by Fred Neil) (1964 album Tear Down The Walls, crediting Dobson).

After returning to Toronto in 1967 she continued to perform locally in coffee houses as well programs on the CBC. She married, and in 1969 moved to London, England, where she took up university studies and later became an administrator of the Philosophy Department at Birkbeck College, part of the University of London.

After retiring in the 1980s, Dobson returned to perform in 2007 in London with Jarvis Cocker; she released a new album in 2013 with the Hornbeam label and that year launched a number of concert dates.

She performed with Combined Services Entertainment, and was one of the last performers at RAF Salalah Oman.

Discography
1961:  Bonnie Dobson Sings 'She's Like a Swallow' and Other Folk Songs (Prestige International 13021; Prestige/Folklore Records 14015 [1963])
1962:  Dear Companion (Prestige International 13031; Prestige/Folklore Records 14007 [1963])
1962:  Bonnie Dobson at Folk City [live] (Prestige International 13057; Prestige/Folklore Records 14018 [1963]) (featuring "Morning Dew")
1964:  Hootenanny with Bonnie Dobson (Prestige Folklore 14018)
1964:  Bonnie Dobson Sings a Merry-Go-Round of Children's Songs (Prestige International 13064)
1964:  For the Love of Him (Mercury MG-20987/SR-60987)
1969:  Bonnie Dobson (RCA Victor LSP-4219) (I Got Stung #82 CanPop / #7 CanCon - August 1969)
1970:  Good Morning Rain (RCA Victor LSP-4277) (Good Morning Rain - recommended CanCon May 1970)
1972:  Bonnie Dobson (Argo [UK] Records ZFB 79) (featuring "Land of the Silver Birch")
1976:  Morning Dew (Polydor [UK] Records 2383 400)
2014:  Take Me for a Walk in the Morning Dew (Hornbeam [UK] Records HBR 0003)

See also
 Tim Rose

References

External links
CanConRox entry

 
Illustrated Bonnie Dobson discography
Bonnie Dobson's official website

1940 births
Living people
Canadian expatriates in the United States
Canadian women singer-songwriters
Canadian folk guitarists
Canadian folk singer-songwriters
Canadian women folk guitarists
Musicians from Toronto